Rickia wasmannii is a species of the widely distributed entomoparasitic order of fungi Laboulbeniales. It is an obligatory ectoparasite of ants of the genus Myrmica. The thalli penetrate outer layer of the cuticle, and appear on the host body surface. Little is known about its effect on the host ant, but it is usually regarded as a rather neutral symbiont. Contrarily, however, a recent study has documented an increased need of drinking water and a shortened life-span of infected ants.

The known host species of Rickia wasmannii are various Myrmica species, the most frequent being Myrmica scabrinodis. The fungus was reported from many European countries such as Austria, Bulgaria, the Czech Republic, France, Germany, Hungary, Italy, Luxembourg, Slovakia, Slovenia, Spain, Switzerland, and the United Kingdom.

In 2016, Pfiegler et al.
showed that inquiline mites can become infected by R. wasmannii, which was thought to be restricted to the genus Myrmica (Hymenoptera: Formicidae). This was the first report of R. wasmannii from an alternative host in another subphylum (Chelicerata). These authors also found immature fruiting bodies on a larva of Microdon myrmicae (Diptera: Syrphidae), which represents the first report of any Rickia species on flies. Rickia wasmannii is thus capable of infecting alternative, unrelated host species as they co-occur in the ant nest “microhabitat”. The authors commented that the presence of R. wasmannii on inquilines in Myrmica ant nests suggests that the parasite may have adapted to the ant nest environment and is less dependent on acquiring specific nutrients from the hosts. However, they mentioned that the alternative cannot be excluded; these infections might also represent chance events if the fungus is incapable of fulfilling its life cycle.

References

 Bezdĕčka P et al. (2011) First record of the myrmecophilous fungus Rickia wasmannii (Ascomycetes: Laboulbeniales) in Slovakia. Folia faunistica Slovaca 16(2): 71–72.
 Cavara F (1899) Di una nuova Laboulbeniacea Ricka wasmannii. Malpighia 13: 173–187.
 Csata E et al. (2013) Comprehensive survey of Romanian myrmecoparasitic fungi: new species, biology and distribution North-Western Journal of Zoology 9 (1): no. 131101.
 Csata E et al. (2014) Effects of the ectoparasitic fungus Rickia wasmannii on its ant host Myrmica scabrinodis: changes in host mortality and behavior. Insectes Sociaux61: 247–252.
 Haelewaters D (2012) The first record of Laboulbeniales (Fungi, Ascomycota) on Ants (Hymenoptera, Formicidae) in The Netherlands. Ascomycete.org
 Tartally A, Szücs B, Ebsen JR (2007) The first records of Rickia wasmannii CAVARA, 1899, a myrmecophilous fungus, and its Myrmica LATREILLE, 1804 host ants in Hungary and Romania (Ascomycetes: Laboulbeniales, Hymenoptera: Formicidae). Myrmecological News 10: 123.
 Báthori, F., Csata, E. & Tartally, A. (2015): Rickia wasmannii increases the need for water in Myrmica scabrinodis (Ascomycota: Laboulbeniales; Hymenoptera: Formicidae). – Journal of Invertebrate Pathology 126: 78–82.
 Báthori, F., Pfliegler, W.P., Rádai, Z. & Tartally, A. (2018) Host age determines parasite load of Laboulbeniales fungi infecting ants: Implications for host-parasite relationship and fungal life history. – Mycoscience 59: 166–171.
 Báthori, F., Pfliegler, W.P., Zimmerman, C.-U. & Tartally, A. (2017): Online image databases as multi-purpose resources: Rickia wasmannii Cavara (Ascomycota: Laboulbeniales) on a new host ant from a new country by screening AntWeb.org. – Journal of Hymenoptera Research 61: 85–94.
 Báthori, F., Rádai, Z. & Tartally, A. (2017): The effect of Rickia wasmannii (Ascomycota: Laboulbeniales) on the aggression and boldness of Myrmica scabrinodis (Hymenoptera: Formicidae). –  Journal of Hymenoptera Research 58: 41–52.
 Haelewaters, D., Boer, P., Gort, G. & Noordijk, J. (2015): Studies of Laboulbeniales (Fungi, Ascomycota) on Myrmica ants (II): variation of infection by Rickia wasmannii over habitats and time. – Animal Biology 65(3–4): 219–231.
 Haelewaters, D., Boer, P. & Noordijk, J. (2015): Studies of Laboulbeniales (Fungi: Ascomycota) on Myrmica ants: Rickia wasmannii in the Netherlands. – Journal of Hymenoptera Research 44: 39–47.
 Markó, B., Csata, E. Erős, K. Német, E. Czekes, Zs. & Rózsa, L. (2016): Distribution of the myrmecoparasitic fungus Rickia wasmannii (Ascomycota: Laboulbeniales) across colonies, individuals, and body parts of Myrmica scabrinodis. – Journal of Invertebrate Pathology 136: 74–80.
 Pfliegler, W.P., Tálas, L., Báthori, F., Tartally, A., Pócsi, I. & Szemán-Nagy, G. (2016): Antifungal effect of silver nanoparticles on Rickia wasmannii Cavara (Ascomycota: Laboulbeniales) infecting Myrmica scabrinodis Nylander (Formicidae) ants. – Sociobiology 63(2): 851–854.

Laboulbeniaceae
Fungi described in 1899